The 2015 Monte Carlo Rally (formally known as the 83ème Rallye Automobile Monte-Carlo) was a motor racing event for rally cars that was held over four days between 22 and 25 January 2015. It marked the eighty-third running of the Monte Carlo Rally, and was the first round of the 2015 World Rally Championship, WRC-2, WRC-3, Junior World Rally Championship and FIA R-GT Cup seasons.

Defending World Champion Sébastien Ogier started the season with a win in Monte Carlo, his second consecutive in the principality and the 25th of his WRC career. Returning nine-time World Champion Sébastien Loeb was the early leader of the rally, losing first position to Ogier on the seventh stage after a spin while negotiating a hairpin bend. On the next stage, Loeb hit a rock and lost a total of six minutes, before retiring in the following liaison section. This gave Ogier a lead of almost two minutes over Volkswagen team-mate Jari-Matti Latvala. Despite being unable to monitor his rivals' split times during the stages under new rules, Ogier blended a controlled pace with safe tyre choices through the final two days to seal the victory. Latvala finished second, also taking one power stage point, with Andreas Mikkelsen completing a one-two-three for Volkswagen Motorsport. Citroën's Mads Østberg finished the event in fourth position. Hyundai Motorsport duo Thierry Neuville and Dani Sordo finished in fifth and sixth, split by 0.8 seconds. M-Sport's Elfyn Evans finished seventh, having dropped time after he damaged his car's rear suspension against a wall. Evans finished ahead of Loeb, who rejoined under rally-2 rules and won two power stage points. The top ten was completed by Martin Prokop and Kris Meeke, who won the power stage to take three additional points.

In the support classes, Stéphane Lefebvre won WRC-2 in 12th position overall, Quentin Gilbert finished as the best WRC-3/JWRC runner in 22nd place, just ahead of the FIA R-GT Cup winner François Delecour.

Entry list

Results

Event standings

Special stages

Championship standings after the event

WRC

Drivers' Championship standings

Manufacturers' Championship standings

Other

WRC2 Drivers' Championship standings

WRC3 Drivers' Championship standings

JWRC Drivers' Championship standings

FIA R-GT Drivers' Championship standings

References

External links
 
 The official website of the World Rally Championship

Monte Carlo Rally
Monte Carlo Rally
Rally
Monte Carlo